The 2003 Women's County One-Day Championship was the 7th cricket Women's County Championship season. It took place in July and saw 21 county teams compete in a series of divisions. Sussex Women won the County Championship as winners of the top division, achieving their first Championship title.

Competition format 
Teams played matches within a series of divisions with the winners of the top division being crowned County Champions. Matches were played using a one day format with 50 overs per side.

The championship works on a points system with positions within the divisions being based on the total points. Points were awarded as follows:

Win: 12 points. 
Tie:  6 points. 
Loss: Bonus points.
No Result: 11 points.
Abandoned: 11 points.

Up to five batting and five bowling points per side were also available.

Teams
The 2003 Championship consisted of three divisions of six teams apiece, with teams playing each other once. The Emerging Counties competition was also competed in 2003: a tier below the County Championship, consisting of three teams, playing each other once.

County Championship

Division One 

Source: ECB Women's County Championship

Division Two 

Source: ECB Women's County Championship

Division Three 

Source: ECB Women's County Championship

Emerging Counties

Source: ECB Women's County Championship

Statistics

Most runs

Source: CricketArchive

Most wickets

Source: CricketArchive

References

2003